Admiral Parker may refer to:

Sir Charles Parker, 5th Baronet (1792–1869), British Royal Navy admiral
Edward N. Parker (1904–1989), U.S. Navy vice admiral
George Parker (Royal Navy officer) (1767–1847), British Royal Navy admiral
Henry Parker (Royal Navy officer) (born 1963), British Royal Navy rear admiral
Sir Hyde Parker, 5th Baronet (1714–1782), British Royal Navy vice admiral
Hyde Parker (Royal Navy officer, born 1739) (1739–1807), British Royal Navy admiral
Hyde Parker (Royal Navy officer, born 1784) (1784–1854), British Royal Navy vice admiral
Sir Peter Parker, 1st Baronet (1721–1811), British Royal Navy admiral
Robert C. Parker (born 1957), U.S. Coast Guard rear admiral
Sir William Parker, 1st Baronet, of Harburn (1743–1802), British Royal Navy admiral
Sir William Parker, 1st Baronet, of Shenstone (1781–1866), British Royal Navy admiral

See also
Foxhall A. Parker Sr. (1788–1857), U.S. Navy commodore, prior to institution of the rank of admiral
Foxhall A. Parker Jr. (1821–1879), U.S. Navy commodore, prior to institution of the rank of admiral
James P. Parker (1855–1942), U.S. Navy commodore